Linköping Central Station is a railway station located at Linköping in  Linköping Municipality, Sweden. It is located on the Södra stambanan, which runs from Katrineholm to Malmö.

History 
The station was constructed between 1871 and 1872 and was designed by the architect Adolf W. Edelsvärd. The architecture of the station was inspired by the Renaissance Revival architecture. It has two floors with windows, symmetric design, red and yellow colors.    

The station is situated on the Southern Main Line passing by Katrineholm. Linköping railway station is located in the northern eastern part of the city.

Gallery

References 

Railway stations in Östergötland County
Buildings and structures in Linköping
Railway stations opened in 1872
1872 establishments in Sweden
Railway stations on the Southern Main Line